was a Japanese samurai and commander of the Sengoku period. He was one of the most important vassal of the Mōri clan and one of the four main officers called Goyonin who supported Mōri Terumoto along with Kikkawa Motoharu, Kobayakawa Takakage and Fukubara Sadatoshi. 

He was in charge of the conquest of mainly the San'in region.

In 1530, he was given Ōchi domain, strategically important place to rule and he built a castle called Biwakō Castle in there. He was also the keeper of Gassantoda Castle. 

His grave is at Shūrinji Temple near the Biwakō Castle.

References

Samurai
1513 births
1582 deaths
Mōri clan